The Reguibat (variously transliterated Reguibate, Rguibat, R'gaybat, R'gibat, Erguibat, Ergaybat) is a Sahrawi tribe of Sanhaja-Berber origins. The Reguibat speak Hassaniya Arabic, and are Arabized in culture. They claim descent from Sidi Ahmed Rguibi, who lived in the Saguia el-Hamra region in the 16th century. They also believe that they are, through him, a chorfa tribe, i.e. descendants of Muhammad. Religiously, they belong to the Maliki school of Sunni Islam.

History 

Initially an important Arabic zawiya or religious tribe with a semi-sedentary lifestyle, the Reguibat gradually turned during the 18th century towards camel-rearing, raiding and nomadism, in response attacks from neighbouring tribes which provoked them into taking up arms and leaving the subordinate position they had previously held. This started a process of rapid expansion, and set the Reguibat on the course towards total transformation into a traditional warrior tribe In the late 19th century, they had become well-established as the largest Sahrawi tribe, and were recognized as the most powerful warrior tribe of the area.

The grazing lands of the Reguibat fractions extended from Western Sahara into the northern half of Mauritania, the edges of southern Morocco and northern Mali, and large swaths of western Algeria (where they captured the town of Tindouf from the Tajakant tribe in 1895, and turned into an important Reguibat encampment). The Reguibat were known for their skill as warriors, as well as for an uncompromising tribal independence, and dominated large areas of the Sahara desert through both trade and use of arms.

Reguibat Sahrawis were very prominent in the resistance to French and Spanish colonization in the 19th and 20th century, and could not be subdued in the Spanish Sahara until 1934, almost 50 years after the area was first colonized by Spain. Since the 1970s, many Reguibat have been active in the Polisario Front's resistance to Moroccan rule over the still non-sovereign Western Sahara territory. Polisario leader Mohamed Abdelaziz was Reguibi, as is the Moroccan CORCAS leader Khalihenna Ould Errachid.

See also
 Djema'a

References

Further reading 

 John Mercer (1976), Spanish Sahara, George Allen & Unwid Ltd
 Anthony G. Pazzanita (2006), Historical Dictionary of Western Sahara, Scarecrow Press
 Virginia Thompson and Richard Adloff (1980), The Western Saharans. Background to Conflict, Barnes & Noble Books

Arabized Berbers
Bedouin groups
Ethnic groups in Algeria
Ethnic groups in Mauritania
Ethnic groups in Morocco
Ethnic groups in Western Sahara
History of Mauritania
Sahrawi tribes
Sanhaja